Islam Rezuanovich Tlupov (born 23 March 1994) is a Russian football player who plays for Spartak Nalchik.

Club career
He made his debut in the Russian Football National League for PFC Spartak Nalchik on 13 July 2013 in a game against FC Neftekhimik Nizhnekamsk.

He played in the 2017-18 Russian Cup final for FC Avangard Kursk on 9 May 2018 in the Volgograd Arena against 2–1 winners FC Tosno.

References

External links
 
 
 
 

1994 births
Sportspeople from Nalchik
Living people
Russian footballers
Association football forwards
PFC Spartak Nalchik players
FC Avangard Kursk players
FC Tom Tomsk players
FC Slavia Mozyr players
Russian expatriate footballers
Expatriate footballers in Belarus
Russian expatriate sportspeople in Belarus